Viridichira is a genus of moths in the subfamily Lymantriinae. The genus was erected by Ugo Dall'Asta in 1981.

Lepidoptera and Some Other Life Forms suggests that this name is a synonym of Dasychira Hübner, [1809].

Species known in Africa
Viridichira brevistriata Dall'Asta, 1981
Viridichira cameruna (Aurivillius, 1904)
Viridichira longistriata (Hering, 1926)
Viridichira ochrorhabda (Collenette, 1937)

References

Lymantriinae
Noctuoidea genera